Red Horse Tavern, also known as Brookside Inn and The Old Stone House, is a historic inn and tavern located near Aurora, Preston County, West Virginia. It was built between 1825 and 1827, as a dwelling.  In 1841, it opened as a public inn to serve travelers on the Northwestern Turnpike.  It is built of rubble stone, and has one large downstairs room and three upstairs rooms with an attic above them.

It was listed on the National Register of Historic Places in 1973, with a boundary increase in 1979.   It is located in the Brookside Historic District.

References

Houses in Preston County, West Virginia
Drinking establishments on the National Register of Historic Places in West Virginia
Hotel buildings on the National Register of Historic Places in West Virginia
Houses completed in 1827
Houses on the National Register of Historic Places in West Virginia
Northwestern Turnpike
Stone houses in West Virginia
National Register of Historic Places in Preston County, West Virginia
Historic district contributing properties in West Virginia
1827 establishments in Virginia